Bevoor  is a village in the southern state of Karnataka, India. It is located in the Bagalkot taluk of Bagalkot district in Karnataka.

Demographics
 India census, Bevoor had a population of 5356 with 2698 males and 2658 females.

References

External links
 http://Bagalkot.nic.in/

Villages in Bagalkot district